The 2021 Triglav osiguranje Radivoj Korać Cup was the 19th season of the Serbian men's national basketball cup tournament. The tournament was held in Novi Sad between 11–14 February 2021. All games will be played behind closed doors due to the COVID-19 pandemic in Serbia.

Partizan NIS was the three-time defending champion. Radnički Kragujevac, Mladost Zemun, and Vojvodina made their debuts at the national cup tournament. Crvena zvezda mts won its 7th Serbian Cup title following a 73–60 win over Mega Soccerbet.

Qualified teams

L The league table position after 15 rounds played

Personnel and sponsorship

Venue
The tournament reportedly planned to have been played in Belgrade. However, it was announced that the tournament will be held in Novi Sad. It is the first time since 2004 that will be held in Novi Sad.

Draw 
The draw was conducted on Wednesday 3 February 2021 at the Arena Sport live show. It was held by former basketball players Željko Rebrača and Zoran Sretenović.

1 The lowest ABA League position after 13 rounds played

Bracket

Quarterfinals
All times are local UTC+1.

Mega Soccerbet v Mladost Zemun

FMP v Vojvodina

It was the first time since the 2015 tournament that a BLS team won over an ABA team in the quarterfinals.

Partizan NIS v Borac Čačak

Crvena zvezda mts v Radnički Kragujevac

Semifinals

Mega Soccerbet v Vojvodina

Partizan NIS v Crvena zvezda mts

Final
It is the first time since 2016 that Crvena Zvezda and Partizan won't play in the Final. Previously, Crvena zvezda and Mega played in the 2015 Final. Also, its fourth Cup Final for Mega.

See also
2020–21 Basketball League of Serbia
2020–21 KK Crvena zvezda season
2020–21 KK Partizan season
2020–21 Milan Ciga Vasojević Cup

References

External links
 

Radivoj Korać Cup
Radivoj
Serbia